The 2012–13 season of the OK Liga was the 44th season of top-tier rink hockey in Spain.

Coinasa Liceo won the championship by a single point difference. It was its seventh overall title and the first since 1992–93 season.

Teams

Standings

Top goal scorers

Copa del Rey

The 2013 Copa del Rey was the 70th edition of the Spanish men's roller hockey cup. It was played in Oviedo between the eight first qualified teams after the first half of the season.

Moritz Vendrell won its first title ever.

Quarter-finals

Semifinals

Final

References

External links
Real Federación Española de Patinaje

OK Liga seasons
2012 in roller hockey
2013 in roller hockey
2012 in Spanish sport
2013 in Spanish sport